Shyam Dhar Mishra (1919–2001) was an Indian politician. He was a Member of Parliament, representing Uttar Pradesh in the Rajya Sabha the upper house of India's Parliament representing the Indian National Congress.

References

External links
 Official Biographical Sketch in Lok Sabha Website

Rajya Sabha members from Uttar Pradesh
Indian National Congress politicians
1919 births
2001 deaths
India MPs 1962–1967